To the Devil — a Diva! is a 2004 horror novel by English author, Paul Magrs. It is an homage to classic British horror, such as the films of Hammer.

Synopsis

Karla Sorensen is the fading one-time star of a glut of low-budget Hammer-style horror movies from the 1960s and 1970s, who finds herself in the new millennium short on cash and willing to work anywhere - even on Menswear, the most cutting-edge soap opera on television.

Fortunately, as she sold her soul to the Devil during the World War II, Karla has hidden reserves to fall back on...

Trivia

Professor John Cleavis is based on author C. S. Lewis, and first appeared in Magrs' Doctor Who novel Mad Dogs and Englishmen (2002) and then in Philip Purser-Hallard's Time Hunter novella, Peculiar Lives.

The title is a play on the title of the 1953 Dennis Wheatley novel, To the Devil - a Daughter!, which was made into a movie by Hammer in 1976.

2004 novels
British Gothic novels
British horror novels
Deal with the Devil
Novels set in England